Francisco "Paco" Jémez Martín (born 18 April 1970) is a Spanish football manager and former player who played as a central defender. He is the manager of Iranian club Tractor.

Over 11 seasons, he played 269 La Liga matches in representation of three teams, mainly Deportivo and Zaragoza. He appeared for Spain at Euro 2000.

Jémez started working as a manager in 2007, going on to work with several clubs.

Playing career

Club
Jémez was born in Las Palmas, Canary Islands. During his career he played for Córdoba CF, Real Murcia, Rayo Vallecano (first appearing in La Liga and playing all 38 matches of the season), Deportivo de La Coruña (only totalling ten games in his first two seasons as the club achieved two consecutive runner-up spots, being more used afterwards) and Real Zaragoza, which he helped to the 2001 conquest of the Copa del Rey. From January–June 2004 he returned to Rayo, now in the Segunda División.

After one year out of football, Jémez returned to active with CD Lugo – Tercera División – and retired shortly after at the age of 35.

International
Over almost three years, Jémez played 21 times for the Spain national team. His debut was on 23 September 1998 in a friendly against Russia in Granada, and he was a participant at UEFA Euro 2000, taking part in three matches in an eventual quarter-final exit.

Coaching career

Spain
Jémez took up coaching in 2007, first with lowly RSD Alcalá. He moved to the second division the following campaign, with Córdoba, being sacked with 11 matches to go.

In early 2009, Jémez signed with FC Cartagena, ultimately being the coach that earned the Murcia club a first ever promotion to the second tier. He left in July.

On 12 April 2010, following Sergije Krešić's dismissal, Jémez was appointed coach at struggling UD Las Palmas in division two. He eventually led his hometown side safe from the relegation zone in a 17th-place finish, being dismissed on 27 February 2011.

After taking Córdoba to the first round in the second division promotion playoffs, Jémez was appointed at former club Rayo on 22 June 2012. After leading the team to their best-ever ranking in the top flight, eighth, he renewed his contract until June 2015.

On 26 May 2016, after Rayo's top-tier relegation, Jémez failed to agree new terms and was appointed manager at Granada CF on 20 June. However, on 28 September, he was sacked after only six games in charge, no wins and a club-worst start to a season in more than 70 years.

Mexico
On 28 November 2016, Jémez was named head coach of Cruz Azul in the Mexican Liga MX. He led the team to their first playoff appearance in three years. The following 27 November, he decided not renew his contract and left.

Back to Spain
Jémez returned to Las Palmas on 21 December 2017, becoming the third permanent manager in charge of the club during the campaign. He rejoined Rayo Vallecano in late March 2019, replacing Míchel who had been dismissed two days earlier after losing seven league games in a row, which left the team at risk of top-flight relegation, and agreeing to a deal until June 2020.

On 26 December 2021, after more than a year of inactivity, Jémez took over second-division newcomers UD Ibiza until the end of the season. He managed to avoid relegation, but still left as his contract expired on 31 May.

Iran
In December 2022, Jémez went back abroad, being appointed at Tractor S.C. in the Persian Gulf Pro League.

Personal life
Jémez's father, Francisco Crespo Aguilar (known professionally as Lucas de Écija (1929–2018)), was a flamenco singer who released two records. He himself nearly embraced the sport of golf, having a 1.4 handicap.

Managerial statistics

Honours

Player
Deportivo
Supercopa de España: 1995

Zaragoza
Copa del Rey: 2000–01

Manager
Cartagena
Segunda División B: 2008–09

References

External links

1970 births
Living people
Spanish footballers
Footballers from Las Palmas
Association football defenders
La Liga players
Segunda División players
Segunda División B players
Córdoba CF players
Real Murcia players
Rayo Vallecano players
Deportivo de La Coruña players
Real Zaragoza players
CD Lugo players
Spain international footballers
UEFA Euro 2000 players
Spanish football managers
La Liga managers
Segunda División managers
Segunda División B managers
Tercera División managers
RSD Alcalá managers
Córdoba CF managers
FC Cartagena managers
UD Las Palmas managers
Rayo Vallecano managers
Granada CF managers
UD Ibiza managers
Liga MX managers
Cruz Azul managers
Persian Gulf Pro League managers
Tractor S.C. managers
Spanish expatriate football managers
Expatriate football managers in Mexico
Expatriate football managers in Iran
Spanish expatriate sportspeople in Mexico
Spanish expatriate sportspeople in Iran